Murder in the Mill-Race (sometimes written as Murder in the Mill Race) is a 1952 detective novel by E.C.R. Lorac, the pen name of the British writer Edith Caroline Rivett. It is the thirty seventh in her long-running series featuring Chief Inspector MacDonald of Scotland Yard, one of the numerous detectives of the Golden Age of Detective Fiction. It was released in the United States under the alternative title Speak Justly of the Dead. Originally published by Collins Crime Club, it was reissued in 2019 by the British Library Publishing as part of a group of crime novels from the Golden Age of Detective Fiction.

Synopsis
In the picturesque North Devon village of Milham near Exmoor, the body of a local woman is found floating in the mill race. MacDonald's investigations meet a seeming wall of silence from the locals.

References

Bibliography
 Cooper, John & Pike, B.A. Artists in Crime: An Illustrated Survey of Crime Fiction First Edition Dustwrappers, 1920-1970. Scolar Press, 1995.
 Hubin, Allen J. Crime Fiction, 1749-1980: A Comprehensive Bibliography. Garland Publishing, 1984.
 Nichols, Victoria & Thompson, Susan. Silk Stalkings: More Women Write of Murder. Scarecrow Press, 1998.
 Reilly, John M. Twentieth Century Crime & Mystery Writers. Springer, 2015.

1952 British novels
British mystery novels
Novels by E.C.R. Lorac
Novels set in Devon
British detective novels
Collins Crime Club books